Elections to Ellesmere Port and Neston Borough Council were held on 10 June 2004. One third of the council was up for election and the Labour Party stayed in overall control of the council.

After the election, the composition of the council was:
Labour 29
Conservative 12
Liberal Democrat 2

Results

References
2004 Ellesmere Port and Neston election result

2004 English local elections
2004
2000s in Cheshire